No. 278 Squadron RAF was a Royal Air Force Squadron formed as an air-sea rescue unit in World War II.

History

Formation in World War II
The squadron formed at RAF Matlaske on 22 December 1941 equipped with the Lysander,  Walrus and then the Anson. Spitfires were then supplied for spotting downed aircrew. The area of operations of the squadron was the coast of East Anglia and North East England. There were also detachments in Scotland.

The Warwick was operated from April 1944 and the Sea Otter from May 1945. The squadron was disbanded at Thorney Island on 15 October 1945.

Aircraft operated

References

External links
 History of No.'s 276–280 Squadrons at RAF Web
 278 Squadron history on the official RAF website

278
Military units and formations established in 1941